Ayrton Garcia Ribeiro (born 9 September 1997) is a Portuguese footballer who plays for Münsingen, as a defender.

Football career
On 6 August 2016, Ribeiro made his professional debut with Thun in a 2016–17 Swiss Super League match against Young Boys.

References

External links

1997 births
Living people
Portuguese footballers
Association football defenders
Swiss Super League players
FC Thun players
Swiss Promotion League players
Swiss 1. Liga (football) players
2. Liga Interregional players
Portuguese expatriate footballers
Portuguese expatriate sportspeople in Switzerland
Expatriate footballers in Switzerland
FC Münsingen players